The Tunjur kingdom was a Sahelian precolonial kingdom in Africa between the 15th and early 17th centuries.

Establishment
Local chronicles claim that the founder of the Tunjur dynasty became a "king in the island of Sennar". Origins of the Tunjur state are not well known. It is known that the Tunjur kingdom replaced an earlier Daju kingdom, after Tunjur people migrated from north to the Darfur region in the fifteenth century. Their migration represents a second known Berber migration to the region. The states possibly coexisted for some time, with Tunjur rule in the north and Daju rule in the south, before the Tunjur people managed to replace the earlier dynasty completely. Lands ruled by the Tunjur people are within contemporary Sudan, and their influence also extended into Chad.

Culture
The Tunjur were probably Arabized Berbers, and spoke the Arabic language. They claimed heritage from the tribe of Banu Hilal. However, they were initially entirely pagan after the migration had finished. No trace of their own language exists. All of the Tunjur oral tradition is attributed in an unusual manner to a single person called Shau Dorsid.

Society in Darfur changed drastically due to the influence of Tunjur dynasty. Corvée labor was organized for the newly-organized state, long-range trade began, and Islam was partially adopted as a religion.

Tunjur architecture drew influence from Berber and Tora styles. There is a stone mosque, the first Muslim building in Darfur, possibly built around the year 1200, at the city of Uri which was the first capital of the kingdom. This may indicate that Islam was adopted as a court religion. The king however, probably, held a divine status. The city was built in Fur architecture.

The role of Islam in the region ruled over by the Tunjur kingdom, and earlier the Daju dynasty, remained insignificant until the late 16th century. No material remains for Islamization are known from the preceding Daju dynasty's period.

Tunjur dynasty
By the early 16th century the Tunjur kingdom ruled Darfur and Wadai. Capitals of the kingdom were in northern Darfur. Cities of Uri and Ain Farah are associated with the kingdom. Uri, the early capital, was at the meeting point of two major trade routes. It is certain that Egyptian merchants traded with the Tunjur people. Caravan routes and earlier river based routes through Nubia allowed long-distance trade. The kingdom exported slaves, gold, camels, rhinoceros horn, ivory, ostrich feathers, tamarind, gum arabic and natron. Trade was, according to Egyptian sources, under close royal control. Unlike in the newly-islamized and briefly dynastically related Wadai Empire, it is unclear if the Tunjur kingdom was a Muslim state. Slavery was common in the region, and the Tunjur also engaged in enslavement of other peoples.

End of the dynasty

The Tunjur kingdom was succeeded by the Sultanate of Darfur (Keira Sultanate). The Fur people and their Keira dynasty superseded the Tunjur in about 1650s. A story about a dynastic link between Keira and Tunjur dynasties involving Ahmad al-Maqur is known. Meanwhile, a local dynasty of Maba people replaced Tunjuri rule in Wadai by revolting and expelling the Tunjuri. The Tunjur kingdom may have ceased to exist as early as in 1611 or 1635.

A branch of the Tunjur dynasty in Wadai was also overthrown by an alliance of the Arabs and the Maba.

Eventually, the Tunjur people assimilated to a large decree into other peoples of the region.

See also

Alodia
History of Chad
History of Sudan
Tora (Darfur)

References

Further reading

Darfur
Sahelian kingdoms